The 2018 United States House of Representatives elections in Connecticut were held on Tuesday, November 6, 2018, to elect the five U.S. representatives from the state of Connecticut, one from each of the state's five congressional districts. The elections coincided with the gubernatorial election, as well as other elections to the House of Representatives, elections to the United States Senate, and various state and local elections.

Overview
Results of the 2018 United States House of Representatives elections in Connecticut by district:

District 1

The 1st district is located in the north-central part of the state, and is anchored by the state capital of Hartford. It includes parts of Hartford, Litchfield, and Middlesex counties. The incumbent is Democrat John Larson, who has represented the district since 1999. He was re-elected to a tenth term with 64% of the vote in 2016.

Democratic primary
 John Larson, incumbent

Republican primary
 Jennifer Nye

General election

Results

District 2

The 2nd district is located in the eastern part of the state, and includes all of New London, Tolland, and Windham counties and parts of Hartford, Middlesex, and New Haven counties. The incumbent is Democrat Joe Courtney, who has represented the district since 2007. He was re-elected to a sixth term with 63% of the vote in 2016. The National Republican Congressional Committee has outlined this district as one of the 36 Democratic-held districts it is targeting in 2018. Republican gubernatorial nominee Bob Stefanowski won the district in the concurrent gubernatorial election.

Democratic primary
 Joe Courtney, incumbent

Republican primary
 Dan Postemski, veteran and chairman of the Hampton Republican Town Committee

General election

Endorsements

Results

District 3

The 3rd district is located in the central part of the state and contains the city of New Haven and its surrounding suburbs. It includes parts of Fairfield, Middlesex, and New Haven counties. The incumbent is Democrat Rosa DeLauro, who has represented the district since 1991. She was re-elected to a fourteenth term with 69% of the vote in 2016.

Democratic primary
 Rosa DeLauro, incumbent

Republican primary
 Angel Cadena, Marine veteran and Republican nominee for CT-3 in 2016

General election

Results

District 4

The 4th district is located in the southwestern part of the state, extending from Bridgeport, the largest city in the state, to Greenwich. It includes parts of Fairfield and New Haven counties. The incumbent is Democrat Jim Himes, who has represented the district since 2009. He was re-elected to a fifth term with 60% of the vote in 2016.

Democratic primary
 Jim Himes, incumbent

Republican primary
 Harry Arora, investment firm founder

General election

Results

District 5

The 5th district is located in the northwestern part of the state and includes parts of Fairfield, Hartford, Litchfield, and New Haven counties. The incumbent was Democrat Elizabeth Esty, who represented the district since 2013. She was re-elected to a third term with 58% of the vote in 2016. Esty did not run for reelection in 2018. Republican gubernatorial nominee Bob Stefanowski won the district in the concurrent gubernatorial election.

Democratic primary
Declared
Mary Glassman, former First Selectman of Simsbury, and candidate for Lieutenant Governor in 2006 and 2010
Jahana Hayes, 2016 National Teacher of the Year

Declined
Elizabeth Esty, incumbent congresswoman

Primary results

Republican primary
Declared
 Rich DuPont, businessman
 Ruby Corby O’Neill, retired psychology professor and political activist
 Manny Santos, former mayor of Meriden

Primary results

General election

Results

See also
 2018 United States House of Representatives elections
 2018 United States elections

References

External links
Candidates at Vote Smart 
Candidates at Ballotpedia 
Campaign finance at FEC 
Campaign finance at OpenSecrets

Official campaign websites for first district candidates
Tom McCormick (G) for Congress 
John Larson (D) for Congress
Jennifer Nye (R) for Congress

Official campaign websites for second district candidates
Michelle Louise Bicking (G) for Congress
Joe Courtney (D) for Congress
Dan Postemski (R) for Congress
Dan Reale (L) for Congress

Official campaign websites for third district candidates
Angel Cadena (R) for Congress
Rosa DeLauro (D) for Congress

Official campaign websites for fourth district candidates
Harry Arora (R) for Congress
Jim Himes (D) for Congress

Official campaign websites for fifth district candidates
Jahana Hayes (D) for Congress
John Pistone (I) for Congress
Manny Santos (R) for Congress

Connecticut
2018
United States House of Representatives